Ferdinand Murr (23 August 1912 – 3 June 1978) was an Estonian footballer. He played in eight matches for the Estonia national football team from 1936 to 1938. He was also named in Estonia's squad for the Group 1 qualification tournament for the 1938 FIFA World Cup.

In 1944, Murr fled the Soviet occupation of Estonia to Sweden, where he lived until his death.

References

1912 births
1978 deaths
Estonian footballers
Estonia international footballers
Association football midfielders
Footballers from Tallinn
Estonian World War II refugees
Estonian emigrants to Sweden